Rheasilvia  is the most prominent surface feature on the asteroid Vesta and is thought to be an impact crater. However, the mean is affected by the crater itself.

Discovery 
Rheasilvia was discovered in Hubble Space Telescope images in 1997, but was not named until the arrival of the Dawn spacecraft in 2011. It is named after Rhea Silvia, a mythological vestal virgin and mother of the founders of Rome, Romulus and Remus.

Characteristics 

This basin consists of undulating terrain and a central mound almost  in diameter, which rises  from its base, one of the tallest known mountains in the Solar System, and possibly formed due to a planetary scale impact.

Spectroscopic analyses of Hubble images have shown that this crater has penetrated deep through several distinct layers of the crust, and possibly into the mantle, as indicated by spectral signatures of olivine.

Vesta has a series of troughs in an equatorial region concentric to Rheasilvia. These are thought to be large-scale fractures resulting from the impact.

It is estimated that the impact responsible excavated about 1% of the volume of Vesta, and it is likely that the Vesta family and V-type asteroids are the products of this collision. If this is the case, then the fact that 10-km fragments have survived bombardment until the present indicates that the crater is at most about 1 billion years old. It would also be the origin of the HED meteorites. Known V-type asteroids account for 6% of the ejected volume, with the rest of the fragments presumably either too small to observe, or removed from the asteroid belt by approaching the 3:1 Kirkwood gap, by the Yarkovsky effect, or (in the case of small fragments) by radiation pressure.

Gallery

See also
List of largest craters in the Solar System
List of tallest mountains in the Solar System
Lists of astronomical objects

References

Geological features on main-belt asteroids
Impact craters on asteroids
Surface features of 4 Vesta
Tallest things